QSI International School of Phuket (QSI Phuket) is a non-profit institution that offers education in the English language for pre-school, elementary, and secondary students. The school is a part of the Quality Schools International group, which enrolls student from around the world.

History 
QSI Phuket was founded in August 2000. At the beginning of the school year 2011-2012, 112 students were enrolled. In 2014, QSI Phuket had 129 students enrolled. In June of 2019, QSI Phuket had 68 students enrolled. There are 19 full-time teachers. Assisting them are 5 paraprofessionals.

Curriculum
The curriculum consists of American Literature, British Literature, Creative Writing, Cultural Studies History, Geography, Economics, Comparative Politics, Biology, Chemistry, Physics, Technology, Art, Music, Thai, Health, Photography, Film, and Physical Education. Intensive English is offered to students requiring additional assistance in the English language. We also offer a child protection curriculum called Keep Safe.

Grading 
Mastery of each unit is evaluated with an A or B (mastery grades). B represents mastery at a very good level and “A” represents mastery with the student demonstrating higher order thinking skills.  Mediocre or poor work (C and D) are not accepted. If a student has mastered a unit with a B evaluation, they may wish to demonstrate a higher level of mastery at a later time, within that current school year, to change the evaluation to an A.  A time period (quarter, semester, term) is not evaluated; student performance for the school year is assessed on each essential unit in which a student is engaged.

Athletics 
Sports include volleyball, basketball, football, badminton, and tennis. QSI Phuket has two outdoor football fields, one basketball court, and equipment that can be used to set up a volleyball court. There are other sport facilities that are not owned by QSI, but instead public, that are often used for sports such as tennis and swimming.

High school athletes are offered participation in sport tournaments, with QSI having a football team and a basketball team. There are three football teams in QSI Phuket: the senior team (over 15s), the junior team (under 15s), and the girls' team (12 and up).

Campus
QSI has a secondary building and an elementary building. Both have their own soccer field, but only secondary has a basketball field, where the elementary is free to play on at any time.

QSI has a room called the Activity centre where students have the opportunity to play pingpong or even a play with a real stage. The secondary building contains one lab room, and one art room. The secondary building is made up of one floor, where as the elementary building is made up of two floor, the second floor containing the technology room.

QSI offers College Board Advanced Placement courses. AP courses give the students an opportunity to experience college level education. The classes include Calculus, Physics, and Human Geography.

References

Quality Schools International
International schools in Thailand
Private schools in Thailand
Phuket province
Educational institutions established in 2000
2000 establishments in Thailand